Stanisław Mateusz Rzewuski (1662–1728) was a Polish nobleman (szlachcic).

He was a Royal Colonel since 1690, General of foreign mercenaries contingent and Krajczy of the Crown since 1702, Great Recorder of the Crown since 1703, Field Crown Hetman since 1706, voivode of Podlasie Voivodeship since 1710, Great Crown Hetman and voivode of Bełz Voivodeship since 1726, starost chełmski, drohowyski, kłodawski, nowosielski, lubomski.

He was married to Dorota Cetner and they had one child, Seweryn Józef Rzewuski. He was later married to Ludwika Kunicka and they had four more children: Wacław Rzewuski, Marianna Rzewuska, Sabina Rzewuska and Anna Rzewuska.

Generals of the Polish–Lithuanian Commonwealth
1642 births
1728 deaths
17th-century Polish nobility
Stanislaw Mateusz
Polish people of the Great Northern War
Voievodes of Belz
Field Crown Hetmans
Great Crown Hetmans
Recipients of the Order of the White Eagle (Poland)
18th-century Polish nobility
17th-century Polish military personnel
18th-century Polish–Lithuanian military personnel